Red Bull Racing Team, also known as Team Red Bull, was a NASCAR team owned by Red Bull founders Dietrich Mateschitz and Chaleo Yoovidhya. The team was based in Mooresville, North Carolina in the United States and was managed by Jay Frye. The team suspended operations on December 8, 2011 and their cars were sold to BK Racing.

History

Origins
After moving to a newer location, Roger Penske decided to sell his old facility. Then, on January 26, 2006, the newly formed team said that they would purchase the facility, and would hire 75 workers. However, the team was not allowed to race in the 2006 season because their manufacturer, Toyota, was not cleared to race, so the team decided that they would drive Dodges during the season. The team didn't have any materials to make their race cars, so they purchased multiple cars from Bill Davis Racing.

2006 season
The team was officially started in January, but they would not choose a driver until June 25, 2006, when Brian Vickers announced his decision to drive for the team on Wind Tunnel with Dave Despain. A couple months later, the team made their first NASCAR appearance with Bill Elliott as the driver, at Lowe's Motor Speedway in the No. 83 Victory Junction Gang Dodge, but they failed to qualify for the race. On October 24, 2006, the team chose former Champ Car driver A. J. Allmendinger as the second driver. They also made two other appearances at Atlanta Motor Speedway and Texas Motor Speedway, which like their first, they failed to qualify for both races. Then, announced on December 6, 2006, former Cup Series champion crew chief Doug Richert would serve as the crew chief for Vickers.

2007 season

During the 2007 season, the team moved to Toyota as the manufacturer. Both Vickers and Allmendinger failed to qualify for the 2007 Daytona 500. Allmendinger, in the first duel race, crashed with fellow competitor Robby Gordon on lap 24, causing heavy damage to both their race cars. Vickers blew a right rear tire on lap 51 in the second duel race, ending his chances of making the Daytona 500. One week later, Vickers qualified for the 2007 Auto Club 500, which resulted in the team receiving their first top-ten. After failing to qualify for four consecutive races, Allmendinger qualified for the 2007 Food City 500 held at Bristol Motor Speedway. During the 2007 Coca-Cola 600, NASCAR's longest race, Vickers was able to finish in the top-five. On October 5, 2007, the team's development driver, Scott Speed finished seventh in an ARCA race at Talladega Superspeedway. Allmendinger's team had a forty-third-place finish in the final owners' standings and had 19 DNQ's. Despite Vickers ending the season with five top-ten finishes with one being a top-five in the Coca-Cola 600, where he led seventy-six laps and finished 5th, Vickers still failed to qualify for 13 races. Vickers' team ended the season with a 38th owners' standings position.

2008 season

In 2008, Kevin Hamlin became the crew chief for Vickers. Hamlin's past crew chief roles include stints with Dave Blaney's No. 22 Toyota, preceded by nine years of crew chief duties with Richard Childress Racing drivers including Jeff Burton, Kevin Harvick, and Dale Earnhardt. Hamlin has amassed nine previous Cup wins; five of those with Earnhardt Sr. Said Sawyer of hiring Hamlin: "Finding the right crew chief for the 83 team was a pivotal decision in an effort to restructure the foundation on that team. We need a crew chief with not only the right experience and background to work effectively with our driver and crew, but someone who also shares the same vision for success. We found that package with Kevin Hamlin. Our focus between now and Daytona is not only getting our cars up to speed for the season opener, but also getting Kevin up to speed working with Red Bull, Brian (Vickers) and the 83 team." Due in large part to the additions of Frye and Hamlin, the No. 83 team has been shown to be the most improved in the series, qualifying for all the current races and secured a Top 35 exemption following the spring race at Bristol.
Also in 2008, Allmendinger failed to make the first three races of 2008 and was replaced by Mike Skinner on a temporary basis starting with the spring Atlanta race. Allmendinger returned at the Aaron's 499 at Talladega with a new silver paint scheme, and won the Sprint Showdown two weeks later, making him eligible for the All-Star Race. Allmendinger also recorded a 10th-place finish at the Allstate 400 at the Brickyard. In May, even though Vickers had not won a race for the team prior to Sprint All-Star Race XXIV, they won the All-Star Pit Crew Competition. Later in the season, Allmendinger announced that he was going to leave Red Bull to race for Richard Petty Motorsports in 2009.

2009 season

2009 ended up being a high-water mark for the team, as Vickers scored the team's first victory, and the second of his career, at Michigan in August.  This was part of a strong late-summer run that resulted in Vickers taking the last spot in the 2009 Chase for the Sprint Cup at Richmond in September, also a first for the Red Bull team.  Unfortunately, an underwhelming Chase performance resulted in Vickers finishing 12th in the final points.  Meanwhile, the team signed Scott Speed to replace Allmendinger in the renumbered 82 car.  However, Speed could manage only a distant second to Joey Logano in the Raybestos Rookie of the Year standings.

2010 season
For the 2010 season, Speed and Vickers remained with the team, but on May 21, Vickers experienced medical problems, which resulted in him missing the rest of the season. His replacements were Casey Mears, Reed Sorenson, Mattias Ekstrom, Boris Said, and Kasey Kahne. Speed was let go at the end of the season, and he in turn filed a lawsuit against Red Bull.

2011 season

For the 2011 season, Kahne became a full-time driver for the team, driving car No. 4 (formerly No. 82), and Vickers returned to drive the No. 83 car. On June 20, 2011, the Associated Press reported that Red Bull was planning to leave NASCAR at the end of the season. The team's on-track struggles, combined with a lackluster outreach to the 18–34 demographic, forced their departure. Despite this, Kahne scored the team's final victory at the November race at Phoenix, while Vickers struggled for most of the year, resulting in a 25th-place points finish. Kahne finished the season in 14th. The team fielded a third car, numbered 84, in the final two races of the season, with development driver Cole Whitt behind the wheel. Whitt finished 25th at Phoenix, but crashed out just past halfway at Homestead, finishing 37th. The team officially closed on December 8, 2011. The team's cars, owners points, and equipment were purchased by former TRG Motorsports executive Ron Devine to form BK Racing.

Team results

No. 4/82/84 car

No. 83 car

Nationwide series

See also
Red Bull Racing
Scuderia AlphaTauri

References

External links

Official Website
Red Bull Racing team blog

Defunct companies based in North Carolina
Defunct NASCAR teams
Red Bull sports teams
Auto racing teams established in 2006
Auto racing teams disestablished in 2011
Red Bull Racing
2006 establishments in North Carolina
2011 disestablishments in North Carolina